

History
This was a brigade sized formation of the British Army attached to the 6th Armoured Division.

In the early days of the Second World War the support group (or Pivot Group as it was sometimes known) was what its name suggested. It provided whatever support the armoured brigades needed to the operation in hand, being able to provide motorised infantry, field artillery, anti-tank artillery or light anti-aircraft artillery as needed.

 9th Battalion, The Queen's Own Royal West Kent Regiment (Motor infantry)
12th Regiment Royal Horse Artillery
 72nd Anti-Tank Regiment, Royal Artillery
 51st Light Anti-Aircraft Regiment, Royal Artillery

Commanders
 Brigadier T. Lyon-Smith

References

See also
 List of British brigades of the Second World War

6 Support
Military units and formations established in 1940
Military units and formations disestablished in 1942